Charles Swickard (March 21, 1861 – May 12, 1929) was a German-born American actor and film director of the silent era. He was the brother of the actor Josef Swickard.

Selected filmography

Director
 The Beckoning Flame (1915)
 The Three Musketeers (1916)
 Hell's Hinges (1916)
 Mixed Blood (1916)
 The Beggar of Cawnpore (1916)
 The Raiders (1916)
 The Beckoning Flame (1916)
 The Lair of the Wolf (1917)
 The Plow Woman (1917)
 The Scarlet Crystal (1917)
 The Gates of Doom (1917)
The Phantom's Secret (1917)
 The Light of Western Stars (1918)
 Hitting the High Spots (1918)
 The Spender (1919)
 Faith (1919)
 Li Ting Lang (1920)
 An Arabian Knight (1920)
 The Last Straw (1920)

References

Bibliography
 George A. Katchmer. A Biographical Dictionary of Silent Film Western Actors and Actresses. McFarland, 2002.

External links

1861 births
1929 deaths
American film directors
American male film actors
German emigrants to the United States